Gonini River is a river of Suriname which flows into the Lawa River near Mofina in French Guiana. The river is formed from a confluence between the Wilhelmina River and the Emma River. Both rivers are sourced from the Oranjegebergte which in turn is a subdivision of the Tumuk Humak Mountains. The area was first explored by A. Franssen Herderschee in 1903. The river is home to the Koloegado, Lenabari, Makoe-makoe, and Kotilolo waterfalls.

See also
List of rivers of Suriname

Notes

References
Rand McNally, The New International Atlas, 1993.

External links

Rivers of Suriname